Ayer's Sarsaparilla was a brand of Sarsaparilla invented by James Cook Ayer and sold by his company, Dr. J. C. Ayer and Co. Despite its advertisement as a medicine, its effectiveness is disputed.

References

Soft drinks